DYDW (89.1 FM), broadcasting as Power 89.1, is a radio station owned and operated by Word Broadcasting Corporation, the media arm of the Society of the Divine Word. The station's studio and transmitter are located at the Ground Floor, Dingman Bldg., University of San Carlos, Downtown Campus, P. del Rosario St., Cebu City. It operates daily from 5:00 AM to 11:00 PM.

References

Radio stations in Metro Cebu
Radio stations established in 1988